Léon Emmanuel Monnet (born 1952) is the Minister of Mines and Energy of Côte d'Ivoire and the mayor of Adzopé. He is a member of the Ivorian Popular Front (FPI).

References

Living people
1952 births
People from Adzopé
Ivorian Popular Front politicians
Mayors of places in Ivory Coast

Energy ministers of Ivory Coast